Robert Leon Basmann (born January 15, 1926) is an American econometrician. He was a Professor of Econometrics at Texas A&M University until his retirement. He served as a lecturer at Binghamton University after his retirement. As of at least as recently as 2019 Basmann was still listed on Binghamton Universities listing of emeritus professors.

Basmann held academic appointments at Northwestern University, University of Chicago and Purdue University prior to joining the faculty at Texas A&M.

Basmann earned a Ph.D. in economics from Iowa State University in 1955. He is credited, along with Henri Theil, for deriving two stage least squares estimation.

References

External links 
 Website at Binghamton University

1926 births
Living people
Iowa State University alumni
University of Chicago faculty
Purdue University faculty
Texas A&M University faculty
Fellows of the Econometric Society
Binghamton University faculty
Economists from Texas